Mahmudabad (also Romanized as Maḩmūdābād; also known as Maḩmūdābād-e Jīq) is a city in the Central District of Shahin Dezh County, West Azerbaijan province, Iran. At the 2006 census, its population was 5,817 in 1,507 households. The following census in 2011 counted 6,680 people in 1,835 households. The latest census in 2016 showed a population of 6,866 people in 2,135 households.

References 

Shahin Dezh County

Cities in West Azerbaijan Province

Populated places in West Azerbaijan Province

Populated places in Shahin Dezh County